Ochre Court is a large châteauesque mansion in Newport, Rhode Island, United States. Commissioned by Ogden Goelet, it was built at a cost of $4.5 million in 1892. It is the second largest mansion in Newport after nearby The Breakers. These two mansions, along with Belcourt Castle (the 3rd largest mansion) and Marble House, were designed by architect Richard Morris Hunt. It is owned by Salve Regina University.

History
The Goelets were an American dynasty that had grown from humble 18th century trade into vast 19th century investments. Ogden Goelet was a banker, real estate investor and competitive yachtsman. His wife, Mary Wilson Goelet, oversaw the operation of Ochre Court during a typical eight-week summer season.  This usually required twenty-seven house servants, eight coachmen and grooms and twelve gardeners.

Richard Morris Hunt designed Ochre Court, modelling the mansion on the chateaux of France's Loire Valley. The design is in the Louis XIII-style of architecture, with high roofs, turrets, tall chimneys and elaborate dormers. Elaborate decoration is seen inside and out in classical-style ceiling paintings, heraldry, carved emblems and statues, and a profusion of stained glass.

The Goelets' daughter, May, married Henry Innes-Ker, 8th Duke of Roxburghe, taking with her an $8 million dowry. Their son, Robert Goelet IV, was a businessman with an interest in American railroads, hotels and real estate. Robert gave Ochre Court to the Sisters of Mercy in 1947.

In popular culture
The exterior of this mansion was used for the movie True Lies to depict the Swiss mansion that Arnold Schwarzenegger infiltrates then escapes in the opening sequence.

In the video game Payday 2, the architecture of Shacklethorne Mansion, a fictional mansion which is the location of the Shacklethorne Auction heist in the game, was inspired by the back side of Ochre Court. Shacklethorne Auction does not take place in Newport, but in Salem, Massachusetts.

Gallery

See also

List of Gilded Age mansions

References

Further reading
 Bernier, Maria. "Guide to the Goelet Family Papers." Salve Regina University. 2008. Web. 16 May 2016

External links

Houses completed in 1892
Houses in Newport, Rhode Island
Castles in the United States
Salve Regina University
Historic district contributing properties in Rhode Island
Richard Morris Hunt buildings
Gothic Revival architecture in Rhode Island
Châteauesque architecture in the United States
National Register of Historic Places in Newport, Rhode Island
Houses on the National Register of Historic Places in Rhode Island
Goelet family
Gilded Age mansions